Pío Cabanillas Gallas (13 November 1923 – 10 October 1991) was a Spanish jurist and politician, who held different cabinet posts and served as a deputy in the European Parliament.

Early life and education
Cabanillas was born 13 November 1923 in Pontevedra. His father was a lawyer, and his uncle, Roman C., was a poet. Cabanillas held a law degree.

Career
Cabanillas was a member of the Council of the Realm, which was the highest advisory body in the Francoist Spain. He was the minister of information and tourism in the cabinet led by Prime Minister Arias Navarro which was formed on 4 January 1974 under Francisco Franco. Cabanillas replaced Fernando de Liñán in the post. Cabanillas was removed from office in October 1974 on the orders of Franco due to "being too liberal in lifting press censorship." Cabanillas' successor as minister of information and tourism was León Herrera Esteban. 

Cabanillas was appointed justice minister on 31 August 1981, replacing Francisco Fernández Ordóñez in the post. His term ended on when Fernando Ledesma Bartret was appointed justice minister on 3 December 1982. In 1986, Cabanillas became a member of the European Parliament for the People's Party and served at the parliament until 1991.

Views and activities
Cabanillas was close to Manuel Fraga, former minister. Cabanillas was instrumental both in drafting the 1966 press law which dissolved the press censorship in Spain and in the transition period of Spain from dictatorship to democracy in the 1970s. Although he was described as a reformist during the late Francoist era, he was viewed as a conservative in his later years while serving at the European Parliament.

Death
Cabanillas died of a heart attack in Madrid on 10 October 1991.

References

External links

20th-century Spanish lawyers
1923 births
1991 deaths
Information and tourism ministers of Spain
Government ministers during the Francoist dictatorship
Justice ministers of Spain
MEPs for Spain 1986–1987
MEPs for Spain 1987–1989
MEPs for Spain 1989–1994
People from Pontevedra
People's Party (Spain) MEPs